This is a list of available actual and physical albums belonging to the UK Now That's What I Call Music! series, comprising: compact discs (CD), audio cassettes (AC), vinyl (LP), VHS tape, DVD, and on other short-lived formats. They are categorised by series (country), then ordered by date.

United Kingdom and Ireland 
Initially only released on vinyl and magnetic audio cassette, the first Now That's What I Call Music UK edition to be released on compact disc (CD) was Now That's What I Call Music! 4 in a single-CD format in 1984, although it was a compilation of tracks from all four Now That's What I Call Music vinyl/cassette albums up to that point. Further single-CD versions of Now That's What I Call Music! 8 and Now That's What I Call Music! 9  followed, with full two-disc compact disc releases starting with Now That's What I Call Music! 10 in November 1987. Phonograph record production ended on the numbered series with Now That's What I Call Music! 35, with special vinyl editions of spin-offs like Now That’s What I Call Punk & New Wave (on a double neon pink vinyl set) editions in the 21st century. Audio cassettes ended with Now That's What I Call Music! 64. Part of the series was also released on the MiniDisc format, beginning with Now That's What I Call Music! 43 and ending with Now That's What I Call Music! 48.
Now That's What I Call Music UK volumes 1 through to 18 and Now That's What I Call Music! 20 were released on individual VHS tapes, with the first two albums also issued on LaserDiscs. Every Now That's What I Call Music! UK video tape had a running time of roughly an hour. From 2001 to 2007, the videos were published on DVD with a frequency of one per year. The DVDs are numbered by year and not linked to album numbers. Now 2006 was released on UMD as well as DVD.

The series release dates below represent the date of release in the United Kingdom. Up until the release of Now That's What I Call Music! 90 on 30 March 2015, the release date in Ireland was three days before the UK release. Beginning with the release of Now That's What I Call Music! 91 on 24 July 2015, the release dates in the UK and Ireland have been the same following the announcement of the Global Release Day campaign by IFPI, which became effective on 10 July 2015.

Now re-issues of the original numbered series (2018–present) 
For the 30th anniversary of Now 1 in 2013 and the release of Now 100 in 2018, the first Now album was re-compiled and re-issued. Since the release of Now 102, the corresponding Now album from 100 volumes ago has been re-compiled and re-issued on 2-CD sets on the same day. Due to licensing issues, these re-compiled versions often use alternative mixes such as album versions and sometimes tracks are missing where it has not been possible to license the song.
 Now That's What I Call Music (first reissued 2009 for the 25th anniversary, then again 20 July 2018 to coincide with Now 100) re-issued on 2CD (gatefold in 2009, jewel case in 2018), audio cassette, and a 2LP vinyl release.
 Now That's What I Call Music II (2) (12 April 2019) re-issued on 2CD and a 2LP vinyl release.
 Now That's What I Call Music 3 (19 July 2019) re-issued on 2-CD 28 tracks with Bob Marley and the Wailers and Gary Glitter missing.
 Now That's What I Call Music 4 (8 November 2019) originally a 15 track CD in 1984, now with all 32 tracks.
 Now That's What I Call Music 5 (8 May 2020) David Bowie and the Pat Metheney Group are the only tracks that are missing.
 Now That's What I Call Music 6 (24 July 2020) re-issued on 2CD Bryan Adams & Tina Turner is the only track that is missing.
 Now That's What I Call Music 7 (27 November 2020) David Bowie, Patti Labelle and Michael McDonald, and the Real Roxanne are the tracks that are missing.
 Now That's What I Call Music 8 (26 March 2021) originally a 17 track CD in 1986, now with all 32 tracks.
 Now That's What I Call Music 9 (23 July 2021) originally a 16 track CD in 1987, now with all 30 tracks.
 Now That's What I Call Music 10 (19 November 2021) 28 tracks with Heart and Whitesnake missing.
 Now That's What I Call Music 11 (8 April 2022) 28 tracks with Eddy Grant and Whitesnake missing.
Now That's What I Call Music 12 (29 July 2022). 31 tracks with Phil Collins missing.
 Now That's What I Call Music 13 (18 November 2022) 31 tracks with Phil Collins absent.
 Now That's What I Call Music 14 (14 April 2023) 30 tracks with Phil Collins and INXS absent.

Now Dance series (1985–present) 

The original Now Dance series began in 1985 and has been released in a variety of titles, formats, and release frequency. Originally, the series captured extended 12" mixes of dance hits of the time, but from 1991 onwards, all Now Dance compilations featured 7" edits with  only occasional extended versions or mixes included. The first two volumes were not released on compact disc, and all subsequent releases were either single, double, or triple disc sets. Unlike the main series, Now Dance were originally titled and numbered by their year of release (i.e. Now Dance '89). The frequency in which they were released also varied from year to year; initially, and most frequently across the series, there would be one Now Dance volume per year, but in 1994 for example, there were four volumes released, and in 1996, there weren't any Now Dance compilations released. Towards the end of the series, 3-CD digipak sets were issued, but in 2010, the long-running title was retired, and all subsequent dance-themed Now collections have been issued under the Special Editions series. 

In 2021, the original concept of Now Dance was revived with a new series of compilations containing 12" remixes released under the title, Now That's What I Call Music 12" 80s. 

In February 2023, 12" mixes all taken from the first three Now Dance compilations, originally released in 1985, 1986 and 1989, were collected on a special 4CD and 3LP set, Now Dance: The 80s, with artwork inspired by the original Now Dance 86. Fourteen mixes were taken from Now Dance, eighteen mixes were lifted from 86, and sixteen from 89.

 Now Dance – Extended Dance Versions of 20 Smash Hits (The 12" Mixes) (20 May 1985) 2-LP/MC only. Partially re-issued in 2023 on CD/LP.
 Now Dance 86 – 20 Smash Dance Hits of the Year (The 12" Mixes) (27 October 1986) 2-LP/MC only. Partially re-issued in 2023 on CD/LP.
 Now Dance 89 – 20 Smash Dance Hits (The 12" Mixes) (3 July 1989) 2-LP/MC/CD. Partially re-issued in 2023 on CD/LP.
 Now Dance 901 – 20 Smash Dance Hits (The 12" Mixes) (6 February 1990) 2-LP/MC/CD
 Now Dance 902 (The 12" Mixes) (16 July 1990) 2-LP/MC/CD
 Now Dance 903 (The 12" Mixes) (29 October 1990) 2-LP/MC/CD
 Now Dance 91 – 20 Blissful Grooves (23 September 1991) Single LP/MC/CD
 Now Dance 92 (2 November 1992) Uniquely, 2-LP with 12" mixes and single CD with abridged tracklisting and 7" edits.
 Now Dance 93 – 20 Buzzin' Beats (14 June 1993) Single CD/MC
 Now Dance – The Best of 93 (18 October 1993) 2-LP/2-CD/MC
 Now Dance 94 (17 January 1994) LP/CD/MC
 Now Dance 94 – Volume 2 (7 March 1994) CD/MC
 Now Dance Summer 94 (16 June 1994) 2-CD/MC 
 Now Dance – The Best of 94 (3 November 1994) 2-CD/MC 
 Now Dance 95 – 40 Ultimate Dance Hits (20 March 1995) 2-CD/MC 
 Now Dance Summer 95 (27 July 1995) 2-CD/MC 
 Now Dance 97 (20 October 1997) 2-CD/MC 
 Now Dance 98 (2 November 1998) 2-CD/MC 
 Now Dance 2000 (18 October 1999) 2-CD/MC
 Now Dance 2001 (23 October 2000) 2-CD/MC
 Now Dance 2001 – Part Two (19 March 2001) 
 Now Dance 2002 (22 October 2001)
 Now Dance 2002 – Part Two (4 March 2002) 
 Now Dance 2003 (14 October 2002) 
 Now Dance 2003 – Part Two (31 March 2003) 
 Now Dance 2004 (27 October 2003) 
 Now Dance – 41 Brand New Dance Hits (22 March 2004) 
 Now Dance – 42 Brand New Dance Hits (18 October 2004) 
 The Very Best of Now Dance (26 September 2005)
 Now Dance 2007 (16 October 2006)
 Now Dance 2008 (15 October 2007)
 Now Dance Anthems (21 September 2009) Released in association with Ministry of Sound.
 The Very Best of Now Dance 2010 (18 October 2010)
 The Very Best of Now Dance (8 December 2014)
 Now Dance: The 80s (17 February 2023) 4-CD/3-LP. Partial re-issue of the first three Now Dance compilations.

Christmas series (1985–present) 
 Now – The Christmas Album/Tape/Compact Disc (11 November 1985)
 Now! – The Christmas Album (27 November 2000)
 Now Xmas – Massive Christmas Hits (14 November 2005)
 Now That's What I Call Xmas (16 November 2009)
 Now That's What I Call Xmas (2011) (7 November 2011)
 Now That's What I Call Christmas (5 November 2012)
 Now That's What I Call Christmas (2013) (4 November 2013)
 Now That's What I Call Christmas (2015) (6 November 2015)
 Now – The Christmas Album (2016) (25 November 2016, LP only)
 Now That's What I Call Christmas (2021) (29 October 2021)
 Now That's What I Call Christmas (2022) (28 October 2022)

Special Editions (1986–present) 

The Special Editions series includes a wide range of Now anniversary collections, different music genres, eras, and decades, as well as commercial tie-ins with Smash Hits, Disney, Eurovision, HMV and the Official Chart Company. They all vary from one to five disc compilations (occasionally six disc), starting in 1986 and continuing to the present day (Jan 2023). Initially, a special edition of a Now compilation was quite rare, and between 1994 and 2002, there weren't any released at all. From 2003, and until 2010, there was one special edition released each year, covering a decade (80s, 90s and 00s), or a cross section of big hits celebrating the  Now series (Now Decades, Now Years, Now Dance) - however, from 2011, they became much more frequent, and in 2017, there were fifteen different titles released.  The presentation of each release has evolved notably over time: from 1986 through to 2013, all double and triple CD sets were released in chubby Jewel cases which could hold up to 6 discs. From Now That's What I Call 30 Years, in 2013, all Special Editions were released as gatefold digipak sets (but rare 2-CD set were still issued in Jewel cases during this period). In 2019 and until the end of 2020, Now 100 Hits were all issued in glossy, gatefold "digifile" sleeves (similar to the digipak, but without plastic trays) where the CDs are pushed out from either side of each sleeve; from the 4 CD series sets  starting in January 2021, gatefold cardboard sleeves are retained, but each CD is now stored in a slot cut into the card, known as a "wallet", which makes the CDs easier to remove than the previous design. Some of the Special Editions have identical names, although a few of these titles are followed by their year of release. In November 2018, the Now team took over the "100 Hits" brand from Demon Music Group, and in 2019 and 2020, the Special Editions series was effectively rested while 24 different Now 100 Hits compilations were issued in very quick succession, until the end of November 2020. From January 2021, the Special Editions series resumed, albeit with reduced output due to the introduction of two new series; Now Yearbook and the 4-CD series, with these three release variations, along with the reissues of the original Now That's What I Call Music series (up to Now 13 by November 2022) continue to the present day (March 2023).

 Now That's What I Call Music – The Summer Album (6 July 1986) Double-LP/MC only
  Now That's What I Call Music '86 (27 October 1986) Single-CD only
 Now That's What I Call Music, Smash Hits (August 1987) 2-CD/MC/LP. Released in association with Smash Hits magazine.
 Now That's What I Call Love (5 February 1994) Single-CD/MC
 Now That's What I Call Music! Decades – The Deluxe Edition (29 September 2003) 3-CD. Released to celebrate the 20th anniversary of Now.
 Now That's What I Call Music! Years (27 September 2004) 3-CD. Released to celebrate the 21st anniversary of Now.
 Now That's What I Call No. 1's (30 October 2006) 3-CD
 Now That's What I Call the 80s (29 October 2007) 3-CD
 Now That's What I Call Music! 25 Years (27 October 2008) 3-CD. Released to celebrate the 25th anniversary of Now.
 Now That's What I Call the 90s 2009 (26 October 2009) 3-CD
 Now That's What I Call the 00s (15 February 2010) 3-CD
 Now That's What I Call a Wedding! (18 April 2011) 2-CD
 Now That's What I Call R&B (26 September 2011) 2-CD
 Now That's What I Call Disney 2011 (21 November 2011) 2-CD. Released in association with Disney
 Now That's What I Call Classical (28 November 2011) 2-CD. Released in association with Decca Records.
 Now That's What I Call Love (30 January 2012) 2-CD
 Now That's What I Call Running 2012 (5 March 2012) 3-CD, BPI: Platinum
 Now That's What I Call Britain (21 May 2012) 3-CD
 Now That's What I Call Reggae (25 June 2012) 3-CD
 Now That's What I Call a No.1 (9 July 2012) 3-CD. Released in association with the Official Charts Company to celebrate 60 years of the official UK singles chart
 Now That's What I Call Chill (20 August 2012) 2-CD
 Now That's What I Call 90s Dance (29 October 2012) 3-CD
 Now That's What I Call Disney 2012 (2012 edition with one bonus CD) (November 2012) Released in association with Disney
 Now That's What I Call Musicals 2012 (26 November 2012) 2-CD
 Now That's What I Call 30 Years (27 May 2013) 3-CD.  Released to celebrate the 30th anniversary of Now.
 Now That's What I Call Disco (26 August 2013) 3-CD
 Now That's What I Call 80s Dance (14 October 2013) 3-CD
 Now That's What I Call Music! USA (21 October 2013) 3-CD
 Now That's What I Call Disney Princess (28 October 2013) 2-CD. Released in association with Disney
 Now That's What I Call The Movies (11 November 2013) 3-CD
 Now That's What I Call Relaxing Classical (25 November 2013) 2-CD. Released in association with Decca Records.
 Now That's What I Call Club Hits (9 December 2013) 3-CD
 Now That's What I Call Running 2014 (10 March 2014) 3-CD, BPI: Gold
 Now That's What I Call Feel Good (17 March 2014) 3-CD
 Now That's What I Call The 21st Century (21 April 2014) 3-CD
 Now That's What I Call Rock (2 June 2014)
 Now That's What I Call Summer 2014 (23 June 2014) 3-CD
 Now That's What I Call Chilled (18 August 2014) 3-CD
 Now That's What I Call Club Hits 2014 (8 September 2014) 3-CD
 Now That's What I Call a Drive (15 September 2014) 3-CD
 Now That's What I Call a Million 2014 (27 October 2014) 3-CD
 Now That's What I Call Disney 2014 (10 November 2014) 2-CD. Released in association with Disney
 Now That's What I Call the 90s 2014 (17 November 2014) 3-CD
 Now That's What I Call Legends (24 November 2014) 2-CD
 Now That's What I Call Musicals 2014 (24 November 2014) 3-CD
 Now That's What I Call a Party 2015 (1 December 2014) 3-CD
 Now That's What I Call Power Ballads (26 January 2015) 3-CD
 Now That's What I Call a Song (13 April 2015) 3-CD
 Now That's What I Call Running 2015 (20 April 2015) 3-CD, BPI: Silver
 Now That's What I Call Classic Rock (1 June 2015) 3-CD
 Now That's What I Call A Summer Party 2015 (22 June 2015) 3-CD
 Now That's What I Call House (21 August 2015) 3-CD
 Now That's What I Call Pop (25 September 2015) 3-CD
 Now That's What I Call a Singer (23 October 2015) 3-CD
 Now That's What I Call the 80s (6 November 2015) 3-CD
 Now That's What I Call Party Anthems (27 November 2015) 3-CD
 Now That's What I Call Classical 2015 (27 November 2015) 3-CD
 Now That's What I Call Brit Hits (25 March 2016) 3-CD
 Now That's What I Call Fitness (22 April 2016) 3-CD
 Now That's What I Call Rock Ballads (3 June 2016) 3-CD
 Now That's What I Call A Reggae Party (24 June 2016) 3-CD
 Now That's What I Call Summer Hits (1 July 2016) 3-CD
 Now That's What I Call Dance Hits (19 August 2016) 3-CD
 Now That's What I Call Drivetime (16 September 2016) 3-CD
 Now That's What I Call The 20th Century (21 October 2016) 3-CD
 Now That's What I Call No.1 Hits (11 November 2016) 3-CD
 Now That's What I Call Love 2016 (18 November 2016) 3-CD
 Now That's What I Call Disney Princess (25 November 2016) 3-CD. Released in association with Disney
 Now That's What I Call the 70s (25 November 2016) 3-CD
 Now That's What I Call Party Hits (2 December 2016) 3-CD
 Now That's What I Call R&B (10 February 2017) 3-CD
 Now That's What I Call Mum (3 March 2017)
 Now That's What I Call Running 2017 (24 March 2017) 3-CD
 Now That's What I Call Classic Soul (26 May 2017) 3-CD
 Now That's What I Call Driving Rock (2 June 2017) 3-CD
 Now That's What I Call A Summer Party 2017 (23 June 2017) 3-CD
 Now That's What I Call Old Skool (4 August 2017) 3-CD
 Now That's What I Call Sing (22 September 2017) 3-CD
 Now That's What I Call a Million 2017 (13 October 2017)
 Now That's What I Call Disney 2017 (3 November 2017) 3-CD. Released in association with Disney
 Now That's What I Call the 00s: The Best Of The Noughties; 2000 to 2009 (10 November 2017) 3-CD
 Now That's What I Call the 60s (17 November 2017) 3-CD
 Now That's What I Call An 80s Party (24 November 2017) 3-CD
 Now That's What I Call Country 2017 (24 November 2017) 3-CD
 Now That's What I Call a Party 2018 (1 December 2017) 3-CD
 Now That's What I Call Remix (23 February 2018) 3-CD
 Now That's What I Call Running 2018 (16 March 2018) 3-CD, BPI: Silver
 Now That's What I Call Footie Anthems (25 May 2018) 3-CD
 Now That's What I Call Dad Rock (1 June 2018) 3-CD
 Now That's What I Call Jazz (1 June 2018) 3-CD
 Now That's What I Call a Summer Party 2018 (22 June 2018) 3-CD
 Now That's What I Call Ibiza (3 August 2018) 3-CD
 Now That's What I Call Disney Bedtime (9 November 2018) 3-CD. Released in association with Disney
 Now That's What I Call Rock 'n' Roll (9 November 2018) 3-CD
 Now That's What I Call Easy (16 November 2018) 3-CD
 Now That's What I Call Love Songs (23 November 2018) 3-CD
 Now That's What I Call a Party 2019 (30 November 2018) 3-CD
 Now That's What I Call a Summer Party 2019 (28 June 2019) 3-CD
 Now That's What I Call Eurovision Song Contest (30 April 2021) 3-CD - Reissued in 2022. Released in association with EBU
 Now That's What I Call Footie!: Back of the Net (7 May 2021) 2-CD. Released to coincide with Euro 2020
 Now That's What I Call HMV (24 September 2021) 5-CD. Released to celebrate 100 years of HMV.
 Now #1s (11 November 2022) 5-CD. Released in association with the Official Chart Company to "celebrate 70 years of the official UK singles chart".

Now 100 Hits series (2018–2020)

4-CD series (2021–present) 
The 4-CD series follows the same general format of the original Special Editions series, with genre, era, and decade collections, but over four compact discs (there is also an abridged vinyl version of Punk and New Wave and Rock), meaning they contain more tracks than the original special editions, but fewer than the Now 100 Hits, which preceded this series. They are only issued in cardboard gatefold wallets, with a slot cut into each sleeve which stores the discs.
 Now Decades of Love (22 January 2021)
 Now 70s Glam Pop (29 January 2021)
 Now That's What I Call Country 2021 (20 February 2021)
 Now The 60s Girls: Then He Kissed Me (5 March 2021)
 Now That's What I Call 12 Inch 80s (16 April 2021)
 Now Live Forever: The Anthems (28 May 2021)
 Now That's What I Call Summer 2021 (25 June 2021)
 Now That's What I Call Gold (16 July 2021)
 Now Decades of Soul (13 August 2021)
 Now That's What I Call 12" 80s: Extended (27 August 2021)
 Now Boogie Nights: Disco Classics (17 September 2021)
 Now That's What I Call Disney 2021 (1 October 2021)
 Now That's What I Call Rock 2021 (5 November 2021)
 Now That's What I Call a Massive Party (19 November 2021)
 Now That's What I Call Electronic (7 January 2022)
 Now That's What I Call Punk and New Wave (21 January 2022) 4-CD/2-LP
 Now That's What I Call 12" 80s: Remixed (25 February 2022)
 Now That's What I Call 70s Pop (11 March 2022)
 Now Eighties Dancefloor (22 April 2022)
 Now That's What I Call Timeless: The Songs (27 May 2022)
 Now That's What I Call Pride (17 June 2022)
 Now That's What I Call a 60s & 70s Summer: Seasons in the Sun (24 June 2022)
 Now That's What I Call Power Ballads: Total Eclipse of the Heart (12 August 2022)
 Now That's What I Call 12" 70s (2 September 2022)
 Now Nineties Dancefloor (14 October 2022)
 Now That's What I Call a Massive 80s Party (11 November 2022)
 Now That's What I Call a Love Song (27 January 2023)
 Now That's What I Call 60s Pop (10 March 2023) 4-CD/3-LP

Now Yearbook series (2021–present) 
The Yearbook series are 4-CD and 3-LP vinyl sets, each representing a year of music, which launched in June 2021. Each release has a tie-in block of programming on Now 80s. Each release is issued as a limited edition mini-hardback book, with the CDs in sleeves forming the pages of the 'yearbook' which contains an introductory overview of the year, original 7" single artwork, trivia, chart positions and a quiz. The limited edition 3-LP version is released on bright coloured vinyl. A standard 4-CD version is also issued in a gatefold "wallet" design, which retails cheaper than the mini-hardback books. The first collection focuses on hits from 1983, the birth year of the Now That's What I Call Music series. The year 1984 followed, but after this, the series rewound its year of focus, issuing collections that went from 1982 and backwards into the late 1970s. A triple-CD only release, Yearbook Extra: The Collectors Edition, is issued a few weeks later; these include lesser known tracks and more songs by big artists included on the main album and  they are released only in standard gatefold wallet packaging. A further release, The Final Chapter, a deluxe 4-CD and 3-LP set, was issued in December 2022, rounding off the Yearbook years 1980 to 1984. The same month, a deluxe 5-LP boxset, Now Yearbook '80 - '84: Vinyl Extra, was released. This was the first time tracks from the Extra CD series had been issued on the vinyl format.

Another strand of the Now Yearbook series, in August 2022, is the somewhat experimental release of two limited edition, extended play, 7" vinyl singles, each containing 4 tracks from the corresponding 1983 and 1984 Yearbook. This is the first time the Now That's What I Call Music brand has ever released music commercially on the 7" vinyl format.

The Now Yearbook series continues both forwards, with Now Yearbook '85 issued in November 2022, and backwards, with the release of Now Yearbook '79 in September 2022 (an Extra followed in October). The latter contains a new retro-70s Now logo design and artwork which compliments its 80s sister Yearbook series. 

The tie-in television programmes are a month by month video playlist of tracks, from one year previously featured on a Now Yearbook album, with Bruno Brookes presenting.

 Now Yearbook '83 (25 June 2021) 4-CD and 3-LP red vinyl selection
 Now Yearbook '84 (29 October 2021) 4-CD and 3-LP blue vinyl selection
 Now Yearbook Extra '83 (10 December 2021) 3-CD selection
 Now Yearbook Extra '84 (14 January 2022) 3-CD selection
 Now Yearbook '82 (4 February 2022) 4-CD and 3-LP yellow vinyl selection
 Now Yearbook Extra '82 (18 March 2022) 3-CD selection
 Now Yearbook '81 (20 May 2022) 4-CD boxset and 3-LP red vinyl selection
 Now Yearbook Extra '81 (1 July 2022) 3-CD selection
 Now Yearbook '80 (15 July 2022) 4-CD boxset and 3-LP clear vinyl selection
 Now Yearbook Extra '80 (26 August 2022) 3-CD selection
 Now Yearbook '79 (9 September 2022) 4-CD boxset and 3-LP orange vinyl selection
 Now Yearbook Extra '79 (21 October 2022) 3-CD selection
 Now Yearbook '85 (4 November 2022) 4-CD boxset and 3-LP green vinyl selection
 Now Yearbook '80 - '84: The Final Chapter (2 December 2022) 4-CD boxset and 3-LP gold vinyl selection 
 Now Yearbook Extra '85 (6 January 2023) 3-CD selection
 Now Yearbook Extra '80 - '84: The Final Chapter (10 February 2023) 3-CD selection
 Now Yearbook '86 (24 February 2023) 4-CD boxset and 3-LP translucent purple  vinyl selection
 Now Yearbook Extra ‘86 (20 March 2023) 3-CD Selection

Now Vinyl series (2021–present) 

The 21st century vinyl revival inspired  limited edition vinyl only Now collections. They are not issued on any other format, and are limited to a run of just 1200 copies worldwide. Some of them have unique tracklistings and are not related to similarly themed collections already issued on compact disc, however, more recent releases have been  'selections' taken from a larger CD collection (Rock, for example). Due to the higher cost of pressing vinyl and the limited time they are available, they are at least three times more expensive than their compact disc counterparts. They are mostly pressed on black vinyl as standard although some are released on coloured vinyl. The Now Yearbook series also releases a vinyl selection of its primary release, with an Extra round-up vinyl boxset featuring tracks from the CD-only series, released at the end of 2022.

 Now Presents... The 70s (10 December 2021) Limited edition 5-LP boxset, black vinyl
 Now That's What I Call Christmas (12 November 2021) Limited edition 3-LP boxset, silver vinyl 
 Now That's What I Call Punk and New Wave (21 January 2022) 2-LP, neon pink vinyl
 Now Presents... Electronic (19 August 2022) 5-LP boxset, black vinyl
 Now That's What I Call Christmas (11 November 2022) Limited edition 3-LP boxset, red vinyl
 Now That's What I Call Rock (11 November 2022) 3-LP set, black vinyl
 Now Dance: The 80s (17 February 2023) 3-LP set, red vinyl
 Now That's What I Call 60s Pop (10 March 2023) 3-LP set, white vinyl

10th Anniversary Series (1993–1995) 
To commemorate ten years since the release of the first Now That's What I Call Music! album, from June to August in 1993, a series of ten, 40-track yearly collections were released on CD and cassette (but not vinyl), covering the years 1983 to 1992. The 1993 volume was not originally part of the ten-year anniversary series. This, and two additional volumes were added in 1994 and 1995. These were all released on CD/cassette, but with the 1993 and 1994 volumes also being released on the vinyl format.

 Now That's What I Call Music! 1983 – 10th Anniversary Series (20 June 1993)
 Now That's What I Call Music! 1984 – 10th Anniversary Series (27 June 1993)
 Now That's What I Call Music! 1985 – 10th Anniversary Series (4 July 1993)
 Now That's What I Call Music! 1986 – 10th Anniversary Series (11 July 1993)
 Now That's What I Call Music! 1987 – 10th Anniversary Series (18 July 1993)
 Now That's What I Call Music! 1988 – 10th Anniversary Series (25 July 1993)
 Now That's What I Call Music! 1989 – 10th Anniversary Series (1 August 1993)
 Now That's What I Call Music! 1990 – 10th Anniversary Series (8 August 1993)
 Now That's What I Call Music! 1991 – 10th Anniversary Series (15 August 1993)
 Now That's What I Call Music! 1992 – 10th Anniversary Series (22 August 1993)
 Now That's What I Call Music! 1993 – 10th Anniversary Series (29 August 1993)
 Now That's What I Call Music! 1994 – 10th Anniversary Series (13 September 1994)
 Now That's What I Call Music! 1995 – 10th Anniversary Series (4 September 1995)

The Millennium Series (1999) 
To commemorate the turn of the millennium, a series of twenty Now That's What I Call Music collections were released in 1999 which all contained 36 tracks, and covered hits from the years 1980 through to 1999. These compilations are very similar to the anniversary series, however, they contain a lower amount of tracks and retailed much cheaper than the former series. The first sixteen volumes were all released on the same date, with the final four being issued four months later. They are also notable as being the first time a Now series had released a compilation of hits from the years 1980 to 1982. An earlier compilation tie-in with Smash Hits from 1987 did, however,  include tracks from those years.
 Now That's What I Call Music! 1980 – The Millennium Series (21 June 1999)
 Now That's What I Call Music! 1981 – The Millennium Series (21 June 1999)
 Now That's What I Call Music! 1982 – The Millennium Series (21 June 1999)
 Now That's What I Call Music! 1983 – The Millennium Series (21 June 1999)
 Now That's What I Call Music! 1984 – The Millennium Series (21 June 1999)
 Now That's What I Call Music! 1985 – The Millennium Series (21 June 1999)
 Now That's What I Call Music! 1986 – The Millennium Series (21 June 1999)
 Now That's What I Call Music! 1987 – The Millennium Series (21 June 1999)
 Now That's What I Call Music! 1988 – The Millennium Series (21 June 1999)
 Now That's What I Call Music! 1989 – The Millennium Series (21 June 1999)
 Now That's What I Call Music! 1990 – The Millennium Series (21 June 1999)
 Now That's What I Call Music! 1991 – The Millennium Series (21 June 1999)
 Now That's What I Call Music! 1992 – The Millennium Series (21 June 1999)
 Now That's What I Call Music! 1993 – The Millennium Series (21 June 1999)
 Now That's What I Call Music! 1994 – The Millennium Series (21 June 1999)
 Now That's What I Call Music! 1995 – The Millennium Series (21 June 1999)
 Now That's What I Call Music! 1996 – The Millennium Series (4 October 1999)
 Now That's What I Call Music! 1997 – The Millennium Series (4 October 1999)
 Now That's What I Call Music! 1998 – The Millennium Series (4 October 1999)
 Now That's What I Call Music! 1999 – The Millennium Series (4 October 1999)

DVD series (2001–2011) 
 Now That's What I Call Music! 2001 The DVD (10 December 2001)
 Now That's What I Call Music! 2003 The DVD (2 December 2002)
 Now That's What I Call Music! 2004 The DVD (1 December 2003)
 Now That's What I Call Music! 2005 The DVD (22 November 2004)
 Now That's What I Call Karaoke (21 November 2005)
 Now Quiz – Now That's What I Call a Music Quiz [Interactive DVD] (5 December 2005)
 Now That's What I Call Music! 2006 The DVD (3 April 2006)
 Now That's What I Call a Music Quiz 2 – Interactive DVD Game [Interactive DVD] (4 December 2006)
 Now That's What I Call Music! 2008 The DVD (3 December 2007)
 Now That's What I Call a Music Quiz – The 80s [Interactive DVD] (3 December 2007)
 Now That's What I Call a Family Quiz [DVD] (1 December 2008)
 Now That's What I Call Comedy (2 March 2009)
 Now That's What I Call Fitness (26 December 2011)

United States

Special editions 
Now Presents: Off the Hook (21 May 2002)
Now That's What I Call Music! #1's (24 January 2006)
Now That's What I Call Party Hits! (13 November 2007)
Now That's What I Call the 80s (11 March 2008)
Now That's What I Call Classic Rock (3 June 2008)
The Best of Now That's What I Call Music! 10th Anniversary (11 November 2008)
Now That's What I Call Motown (13 January 2009)
Now That's What I Call Power Ballads (24 March 2009)
Now That's What I Call the 80s 2 (30 June 2009)
Now That's What I Call Club Hits (22 September 2009)
Now That's What I Call Dance Classics (3 November 2009)
Now That's What I Call Love (26 January 2010)
Now That's What I Call Faith (23 March 2010)
Now That's What I Call Club Hits 2 (12 October 2010)
Now That's What I Call the 1990s (9 November 2010)
Now That's What I Call R&B (1 February 2011)
Now That's What I Call the Modern Songbook (8 February 2011)
Now That's What I Call the 80s Hits (3 May 2011)
Now That's What I Call I Wanna Rock (17 June 2011)
Now That's What I Call Classic Rock Hits (1 May 2012)
Now That's What I Call British (17 July 2012)
Now That's What I Call Party Anthems (7 August 2012)
Now That's What I Call Disney (6 November 2012)
Now That's What I Call Love Songs (22 January 2013)
Now That's What I Call Soundcheck (2 July 2013)
Now That's What I Call Disney 2 (11 November 2013)
Now That's What I Call Slow Jams (4 February 2014)
Now That's What I Call Party Anthems 2 (5 August 2014)
Now That's What I Call Disney 3 (27 October 2014)
Now That's What I Call Movies  (3 February 2015)
Now That's What I Call #1's (4 May 2015)
Now That's What I Call Funk (4 May 2015)
Now That's What I Call New Wave 80s (7 August 2015)
Now That's What I Call Halloween (11 September 2015)
Now That's What I Call Disney Princess (30 October 2015)
Now That's What I Call Rock (22 January 2016)
Now That's What I Call Power Ballads Hits (5 February 2016)
Now That's What I Call Broadway (29 April 2016)
Now That's What I Call Party Anthems 3 (5 August 2016)
Now That's What I Call 90's Pop (27 January 2017)
Now That's What I Call a Workout 2017: Hits & Remixes (5 May 2017)
Now That's What I Call Tailgate Anthems (4 August 2017)
Now That's What I Call the 00's (3 November 2017)
Now That's What I Call Disney Junior Music (16 March 2018)
Now That's What I Call Hits & Remixes 2018 (4 May 2018)
Now That's What I Call Party Anthems 4 (3 August 2018)
Now That's What I Call Music! 20th Anniversary: Volume 1 (26 October 2018)
Now That's What I Call Music! 20th Anniversary: Volume 2 (1 February 2019)
Now That's What I Call Hits & Remixes 2019 (3 May 2019)
Now That's What I Call Yacht Rock (2 August 2019)
Now That's What I Call 80s Hits & Remixes (25 October 2019)
Now That's What I Call Yacht Rock Volume 2 (1 May 2020)
Now That’s What I Call a Decade 2010s (7 August 2020)
Now That's What I Call a Decade 1990s (30 April 2021)
Now That's What I Call a Decade 1980s (18 June 2021)
Now That's What I Call 2000s Hip Hop (28 January 2022)
Now That's What I Call a Decade 2000s (6 May 2022)
Now That's What I Call Music! Pride (20 May 2022)
Now That's What I Call Music! '90s Alternative Rock (17 June 2022)
Now That's What I Call Music! Classic Rock (28 October 2022)
Now That's What I Call Music! Hip Hop Party (3 February 2023)

Christmas series 
Now That's What I Call Christmas! (23 October 2001)
Now That's What I Call Christmas! 2: The Signature Collection (30 September 2003)
Now That's What I Call Christmas! 3 (10 October 2006)
The Essential Now That's What I Call Christmas (23 September 2008)
Now That's What I Call Christmas! 4 (12 October 2010)
Now That's What I Call Today's Christmas (25 September 2012)
Now Christmas (8 October 2013)
Now That's What I Call Merry Christmas (7 October 2016)
Now That's What I Call Merry Christmas (6 October 2017)
Now That's What I Call Merry Christmas (5 October 2018)
Now That's What I Call Music! R&B Christmas (2 October 2020)
Now That's What I Call Christmas Classics (10 September 2021)
Now That's What I Call a Wonderful Christmas (16 June 2022)

Country series 
Now That's What I Call Country (26 August 2008)
Now That's What I Call Country Volume 2 (25 August 2009)
Now That's What I Call a Country Christmas (6 October 2009)
Now That's What I Call the USA: The Patriotic Country Collection (15 June 2010)
Now That's What I Call Country Volume 3 (14 September 2010)
Now That's What I Call Country Volume 4 (14 June 2011)
Now That's What I Call Country Ballads (24 January 2012)
Now That's What I Call Country Volume 5 (12 June 2012)
Now That's What I Call a Country Party (7 May 2013)
Now That's What I Call Country Volume 6 (11 June 2013)
Now That's What I Call Country Ballads 2 (21 January 2014)
 Now That's What I Call Country Volume 7 (3 June 2014)
 Now That's What I Call ACM Awards 50 Years (31 March 2015)
 Now That's What I Call Country Volume 8 (9 June 2015)
 Now That's What I Call Country Christmas (23 October 2015)
 Now That's What I Call Southern Rock (29 April 2016)
 Now That's What I Call Country Volume 9 (10 June 2016)
 Now That's What I Call Country #1's (4 November 2016)
 Now That's What I Call Country Volume 10 (9 June 2017)
 Now That's What I Call Country: Songs Of Inspiration (16 March 2018)
 Now That's What I Call Country Volume 11 (8 June 2018)
 Now That's What I Call Country Volume 12 (29 March 2019)
 Now That's What I Call a Country Christmas (4 October 2019)
 Now That's What I Call Country: Songs of Inspiration: Volume 2 (27 March 2020)
 Now That's What I Call Country Classics '90s (5 June 2020)
 Now That's What I Call Country Volume 13 (5 June 2020)
 Now That's What I Call Music! Outlaw Country (19 March 2021)
 Now That's What I Call Country Volume 14 (18 June 2021)
 Now That's What I Call Country Classics 00s (18 June 2021)
 Now That's What I Call Country Volume 15 (3 June 2022)
 Now That's What I Call Country Classics 80s (13 June 2022)

DVD series 
Now That's What I Call Music! DVD: The Best Videos of 2003 (4 November 2003)
Now That's What I Call Music! DVD 2 (2 November 2004)

Latino series 
Now Esto Es Musica! Latino (21 March 2006)
Now Esto Es Musica! Latino 2 (21 November 2006)
Now Esto Es Musica! Latino 3 (9 October 2007)
Now Esto Es Musica! Latino 4 (24 March 2009)

Asian region 
 Now That's What I Call Music! (1995)
 Now That's What I Call Music! 2 (1996)
 Now That's What I Call Music! 3 (1997)
 Now That's What I Call Music! 4 (1998)
 Now That's What I Call Music! 5 (1999)
 Now That's What I Call Music! 6 (2000)
 Now That's What I Call Music! 7 (2001)
 Now That's What I Call Music! 8 (2002)
 Now That's What I Call Music! 9 (2006)
 Now That's What I Call Music! 10 (2008)

Chinese Best series 
 Now Chinese Best (1999)
 Now Chinese Best 2 (2000)

Love series 
 Now That's What I Call Love (1998)
 Now That's What I Call Love 2 (1999)
 Now That's What I Call Love 3 (2000)
 Now That's What I Call Love 4 (2001)
 Now That's What I Call Love (2010)
 Now That's What I Call Love Vol. 2 (2011)
 Now That's What I Call Love (2014)

Plus Series 
 Now+ (2004)
 Now+ Vol.2 (2005)

Special editions 
 Now That's What I Call Jazz (2002)
 Now The Essential Collection (2003)
 Now That's What I Call Jazz (2007)
 Now That's What I Call Arabia 2011 (2011)

Australia

First series
 Now That's What I Call Music 1 (1987) (Vinyl)

Second series
 Now 01 (2002)
 Now 02 (2002)
 Now 03 (2003)
 Now 04 (2003)
 Now 05 (2004)
 Now 06 (2004)
 Now 07 (2004)
 Now 08 (2005)

Third series
 Now Winter 2005 (2005)
 Now Spring 2005 (2005)
 Now Summer 2006 (2005)
 Now Autumn 2006 (2006)
 Now Winter 2006 (2006)
 Now Spring 2006 (2006)
 Now Summer 2007 (2006) (double CD)
 Now Autumn 2007 (2007)
 Now Winter 2007 (2007)
 Now Spring 2007 (2007)
 Now Summer 2008 (2007) (double CD)
 Now Autumn 2008 (2008)
 Now: The Hits of Winter 2008 (2008)
 Now: The Hits of Spring 2008 (2008)
 Now: The Hits of Summer 2009 (2008)
 Now: The Hits of Autumn 2009 (2009)
 Now: The Hits of Winter 2009 (2009)
 Now: The Hits of Spring 2009 (2009)
 Now: The Hits of Summer 2010 (2009)
 Now: The Hits of Autumn 2010 (2010)
 Now: The Hits of Winter 2010 (2010)
 Now: The Hits of Spring 2010 (2010)
 Now: The Hits of Summer 2011 (2010)
 Now: The Hits of Autumn 2011 (2011)
 Now: The Hits of Winter 2011 (2011)
 Now: The Hits of Spring 2011 (2011)
 Now: The Hits of Summer 2012 (2011)
 Now: The Hits of Autumn 2012 (2012)
 Now: The Hits of Winter 2012 (2012)
 Now: The Hits of Spring 2012 (2012)
 Now: The Hits of Summer 2013 (2012)
 Now: The Hits of Autumn 2013 (2013)
 Now: The Hits of Spring 2013 (2013)
 Now: The Hits of Summer 2014 (2013)

Fourth series
 NOW: Volume 1, 2014 (2014)
 NOW: Volume 2, 2014 (2014)
 NOW: Volume 3, 2014 (2014)
 NOW: Volume 1, 2015 (2015)
 NOW: Volume 2, 2015 (2015)
 NOW: Volume 1, 2016 (2016)
 NOW: Volume 2, 2016 (2016)
 NOW: Volume 1, 2017 (2017)
 NOW: Volume 1, 2018 (2018)
 NOW: Volume 1, 2019 (2019)

100% series 
 Now… That's What I Call Music! 100% Dance (1994)
 Now… That's What I Call Music! 100% Ballads (1994)
 Now… That's What I Call Music! 100% Rap (1994)
 Now… That's What I Call Music! 100% Alternate (1994)
 Now… That's What I Call Music! 100% Pop (1994)

Vision series 
 Now Vision 2004 (DVD) (2004)
 Now Vision 2005 (DVD) (2005)
 Now Vision 2006 (DVD) (2006)
 Now Summer 2007 (DVD) (2006)

Special editions 
 Now Xmas (2008)
 Now Xmas (2009)
 Now Xmas (2011)
 Now Dance – Mixed By Denzal Park (2011)
 Now Dance – Mixed By Emily Scott (2011)
 Now: 10 Years Of Hits (2012)
 Now R&B Volume 1 (2014)
 NOW Fitness 2014 (2014)
 NOW Xmas 2015 (2015)
 NOW Fitness 2016 (2016)
 NOW Xmas 2016 (2016)
 NOW Fitness 2017 (2017)
 NOW Xmas 2017 (2017)
 NOW Xmas 2018 (2018)

Benelux 
 Now, This Is CD Music (1985)
 A co-release by EMI Bovema, Ariola Benelux and Virgin Records.

Canada

Original series 
 Now That's What I Call Music (1988)

Current series 
 Now! (1996)
 Now! 2 (1997)
 Now! 3 (1998)
 Now! 4 (1999)
 Now! 5 (2000)
 Now! 6 (2001)
 Now! 7 (2002)
 Now! 8 (2003)
 Now! 9 (2004)
 Now! 10 (2005)
 Now! 11 (2006)
 Now! 12 (2007)
 Now! 13 (2008)
 Now! 14 (2009)
 Now! 15 (2010)
 Now! 16 (2010)
 Now! 17 (2011)
 Now! 18 (2011)
 Now! 19 (2012)
 Now! 20 (2012)
 Now! 21 (7 February 2013)
 Now! 22 (3 September 2013)
 Now! 23 (3 June 2014)
 Now! 24 (3 March 2015)
 Now! 25 (28 August 2015)
 Now! 26 (15 April 2016)
 Now! 27 (23 September 2016)
 Now! 28 (28 July 2017)

Then series 
 Then (1999)
 Then 2 (2000)

Country series 
 Now Country (2006)
 Now Country 2 (2007)
 Now Country Classics (2007)
 Now Country 3 (2009)
 Now Country 4 (2010)
 Now Country 5 (2011)
 Now Country 6 (2012)
 Now Country 7 (2013)
 Now Country 8 (2013)
 Now Country 9 (2014)
 Now Country 10 (2015)
 Now Country 11 (2016)

Special editions 
 Now That's What I Call Rock & Roll (1988)
 Now Blues (2005)
 Now Real Country (2005)
 Now Classic Rock (2005)
 Now Love (2005)
 Now Soul (2005)
 Now New Wave (2005)
 Now Rock N Roll (2005)
 Now Women Who Rock (2005)
 Now Bell Bottom Rock (2005)
 Best of Now (2005)
 Now 1970s (2010)
 Now 1980s (2010)
 Now 1990s (2010)
 Now 2000s (2010)
 Now Classical (2011)

Dance editions 
 Now Dance (2010)
 Now Dance 2 (2011)
 Now Dance 3 (2012)
 Now Dance 4 (2013)
 Now Dance 5 (2014)

Denmark 
 Now That's What I Call Music! 1 (2002)
 Now That's What I Call Music! 2 (2002)
 Now That's What I Call Music! 3 (2003)
 Now That's What I Call Music! 4 (2003)
 Now That's What I Call Music! 5 (2003)
 Now That's What I Call Music! 6 (2003)
 Now That's What I Call Music! 7 (2004)
 Now That's What I Call Music! 8 (2004)
 Now That's What I Call Music! 9 (2004)
 Now That's What I Call Music! 10 (2004)
 Now That's What I Call Music! 11 (2005)
 Now That's What I Call Music! 12 (2005)
 Now That's What I Call Music! 13 (2005)
 Now That's What I Call Music! 14 (2005)
 Now That's What I Call Music! 15 (2006)
 Now That's What I Call Music! 16 (2006)
 Now That's What I Call Music! 17 (2006)
 Now That's What I Call Music! 18 (2006)
 Now That's What I Call Music! 19 (2007)

Big Hits series 
 Now Big Hits 1999 (1999)
 Now Big Hits 2000 (2000)
 Now Big Hits 2001 (2001)
 Now Big Hits 2002 (2002)
 Now Big Hits 2003 (2003)
 Now Big Hits 2004 (2004)
 Now Big Hits 2005 (2005)
 Now Big Hits 2006 (2006)
 Now Big Hits 2007 (2007)
 Now Big Hits 2008 (2008)
 Now Big Hits 2009 (2009)

Special editions 
 Now Hip Hop Vol. 1 (2003)

Finland 
Now That's What I Call Music 1 (2003)
Now That's What I Call Music 2 (2003)
Now That's What I Call Music 3 (2004)
Now That's What I Call Music 4 (2004)
Now That's What I Call Music 5 (2005)
Now That's What I Call Music 6 (2005)
Now That's What I Call Music 7 (2006)
Now That's What I Call Music 8 (2007)

Special editions 
 Now That's What I Call Dance (2003)
 Now That's What I Call Music Pop Hits (2003)
 Now Christmas 2012 (2012)
Now Hits 2013 (2013)

France 
Now! Hits Référence (25 February 2002)
Now! Hits Référence Vol. 2 (17 May 2002)
Now! Hits Référence Vol. 3 (20 August 2002)
Now! Hits Référence Vol. 4 (4 November 2002)
Now! Hits Référence Vol. 5 (25 March 2003)
Now! Hits Référence Vol. 6 (24 June 2003)
Now! Hits Référence Vol. 7 (26 August 2003)
Now! Hits Référence 2005 (29 August 2005)
Now! Hits Référence 2006 (3 July 2006)
Now! Hits Référence 2007 (1 December 2006)

Greece 
 Now No. 1:Αυτά Είναι Τα Hits Σήμερα! (2002)
 Now No. 2:Αυτά Είναι Τα Hits Σήμερα! (2003)
 Now No. 3:Αυτά Είναι Τα Hits Σήμερα! (2003)
 Now No. 4:Αυτά Είναι Τα Hits Σήμερα! (2003)
 Now No. 5:Αυτά Είναι Τα Hits Σήμερα! (2004)
 Now No. 6:Αυτά Είναι Τα Hits Σήμερα!
 Now No. 7:Αυτά Είναι Τα Hits Σήμερα! (2005)
 Now No. 8:Αυτά Είναι Τα Hits Σήμερα!
 Now No. 9:Αυτά Είναι Τα Hits Σήμερα! (2006)
 Now 2010 Αυτά Είναι Τα Hits Σήμερα (2010)
 Now That's What I Call Music 2016 (2015)

Hungary

Original series 
 Now That's What I Call Music (2003)
 Now That's What I Call Music II (2003)
 Now That's What I Call Music 3 (2003)
 Now That's What I Call Music 4 (2003)
 Now That's What I Call Music 5 (2004)
 Now That's What I Call Music 6 (2004)
 Now That's What I Call Music 7 (2005)
 Now That's What I Call Music 8 (2005)

Current series 
 Now.hu 1
 Now.hu 2 (16 February 2004)
 Now.hu 3
 Now.hu 4 (17 February 2005)
 Now.hu 5 (20 July 2005)
 Now.hu 6 (15 February 2006)
 Now.hu 7 (15 September 2006)
 Now.hu 8
 Now.hu 9 (10 July 2007)
 Now.hu 10
 Now.hu 11 (25 June 2008)
 Now.hu 12 (22 April 2009)
 Now.hu 13 (25 November 2009)

Israel 
 Now That's What I Call Music! (1999)
 Now That's What I Call Music! 2 (2000)
 Now That's What I Call Music! 3 (2000)
 Now That's What I Call Music! 4 (2001)
 Now That's What I Call Music! 5 (2001)
 Now That's What I Call Music! 6 (2002)
 Now That's What I Call Music! 7 (2002)
 Now That's What I Call Music! 8 (2002)
 Now That's What I Call Music! 9 (2003)
 Now That's What I Call Music! 10 (2004)
 Now That's What I Call Music! 11 (2006)
 Now That's What I Call Music! 12 (2007)
 Now That's What I Call Music! 13 (2007)
 Now That's What I Call Music! 14 (2008)
 Now That's What I Call Music! 15 (2009)
 Now That's What I Call Music! 16 (2010)
 Now That's What I Call Music! 17 (2011)
 Now That's What I Call Music! 18 (2012)
 Now That's What I Call Music! 19 (2013)
 Now That's What I Call Music! 20 (2014)
 Now That's What I Call Music! 21 (2016)
 Now That's What I Call Music! 22 (2016)
 Now That's What I Call Music! 23 (2018)
 Now That's What I Call Music! 24 (2019)

Dance series 
 Now Dance 2003 (2003)
 Now That's What I Call Music! Dance 2004 (2004)
 Now That's What I Call Music! Dance 2006 (2006)
 Now That's What I Call Music! Dance 2007 (2007)
 Now Dance 2011 (2011)
 Now Dance 2012 (2012)

Hip hop series 
 Now That's What I Call Music! Hip Hop (2004)
 Now That's What I Call Music! Hip Hop 2 (2005)
 Now That's What I Call Music! Hip Hop 3 (2007)

Special editions 
 Now That's What I Call Music!: Best of 2000–2009 (2010)
 Now That's What I Call Running 2015 (2015)

Italy

Original series 
Now – All the Hits Primavera 2000 (2000)
Now – All the Hits Estate 2000 (2000)
Now – All the Hits 2001 (2001)
Now – All the Hits Primavera 2001 (2001)
Now – All the Hits Inverno 2001 (2001)
Now – All the Hits Estate 2001 (2001)
Now – All the Hits Primavera 2002 (2002)
Now – All the Hits Autunno 2002 (2002)
Now – All the Hits Estate 2002 (2002)
Now – All the Hits Inverno 2003 (2003)
Now – All the Hits Estate 2003 (2003)
Now – All the Hits 1 (2004)
Now – All the Hits 2 (2004)
Now – All the Hits 3 (2004)
Now – All the Hits 2006 (2006)
Now – All the Hits 2007 (2007)
Now – All the Hits 2008 (2008)
Now – All the Hits 2009 (2009)
Now – All the Hits 2010 (2010)
Now – All the Hits 2011 (2011)
Now – All the Hits 2012 (2012)
Now - All the Hits 2013 (2013)
Now - All the Hits 2014 (2014)

Current series 
Now! Spring 2007 (2007)
Now! Summer 2007 (2007)
Now! Winter 2007 (2007)
Now! Spring 2008 (2008)
Now! Winter 2009 (2009)
Now! Spring 2010 (2010)
Now! Summer 2010 (2010)
Now Summer Hits 2011 (2011)
Now Superhits – Autumn 2011 (2011)
Now! Spring 2012 (2012)
Now! Summer 2012 (2012)
Now! Autumn 2012 (2012)
Now! Winter 2012 (2012)
Now! Spring 2013 (2013)

All the Hits Italia series 
Now – All The Hits Italia 2001 (2001)
Now – All The Hits Italia 2002 (2002)
Now – All The Hits Italia 2005 (2005)
Now – All The Hits Italia (2005)
Now – All The Hits Italia 2006 (2005)
Now Hits Of The Year (2008)
Now Hits 2010! (2010)
Now Hits 2011! (2011)
Now Hits 2012! (2012)
Now Hits 2013! (2013)

Story series 
Now! Story '80/'81 (2007)
Now! Story '82/'83 (2007)
Now! Story '84/'85 (2007)
Now! Story '86/'87 (2007)
Now! Story '88/'89 (2007)
Now! Story '90/'91 (2007)
Now! Story '92/'93 (2008)
Now! Story '94/'95 (2008)
Now! Story '96/'97 (2008)
Now! Story '98/'99 (2008)

Japan

Original series 
Now!! 1 (1988)
Now!! 2 (1988)
Now!! 3 (1989)

Second series 
 Now That's What I Call Music! 1 (8 December 1993)
 Now That's What I Call Music! 2 (9 November 1994)
 Now That's What I Call Music! 3 (8 November 1995)
 Now That's What I Call Music! 4 (19 June 1996)
 Now That's What I Call Music! 5 (7 November 1996)
 Now That's What I Call Music! 6 (11 June 1997)
 Now That's What I Call Music! 7 (7 November 1997)
 Now That's What I Call Music! 8 (24 June 1998)
 Now That's What I Call Music! 9 (2 December 1998)
 Now That's What I Call Music! 10 (1999)
 Now That's What I Call Music! 11 (6 December 2000)

Third series 
 Now That's What I Call Music! 2001 (27 September 2001)

Best series 
 Now That's What I Call Music! Best (9 April 1999)
 Now That's What I Call Music! Best Returns (28 August 2002)
 Now That's What I Call Music! 90's Best (24 June 2009)
 Now That's What I Call Music! Love Best (30 June 2010)
 Now That's What I Call Music! 00's Best (25 May 2011)
 Now That's What I Call Music! 80's Best (26 May 2011)

Jazz series 
 Now Jazz X'mas
 Now Jazz X'mas millennium
 Now Jazz
 Now Jazz 2
 Now Jazz 3
 Now Jazz 4
 Now Jazz Best millennium
 Now Jazz Vocal
 Now Jazz Ballad
 Now That's What I Call Music! Jazz Hits

Classics series 
 Now Classics
 Now Classics 2
 Now Classics 3
 Now Classics: Cinema & TV
 Now That's What I Call Music! Classic Hits (24 June 2009)

Reggae series 
 Now Reggae
 Now Reggae 1997
 Now That's What I Call Music! Reggae Classics (2011)

Japan series 
 Now Japan
 Now Japan Best
 Now Japan Best 1

Christmas series 
 Now That's What I Call Christmas (2011)

Special editions 
 Now EX
 Now The Party!
 Now Dance
 Now Pianissimo
 Now J-Pop 2001
 Now That's What I Call Music Yo-Gaku Hits (18 November 2009)
 Now That's What I Call Music! Summer 80's & 90's Memories (2011)
 Now That's What I Call Music! 80's Deluxe (2 October 2013)
 Now That's What I Call Music! 90's Deluxe (2 October 2013)
 Now That's What I Call Music! 70's Deluxe (4 February 2014)
 Now That's What I Call Music! 00's Deluxe (4 February 2014)

South Korea 
 Now That's What I Call K-Pop, Best of 2008–2016 (2017)

Mexico 
 Now That's What I Call Music! (1995)
 Now That's What I Call Music! 2 (1996)
 Now That's What I Call Music! 3 (1996)
 Now That's What I Call Music! 4 (1997)
 Now That's What I Call Music! 5 (1997)
 Now That's What I Call Music! 6 (1998)
 Now That's What I Call Music! 7 (2000)
 Now That's What I Call Music! 8 (2001)
 Now That's What I Call Music! 9 (2002)
 Now That's What I Call Music! 10 (2004)

Argentina 
 Now That's What I Call Music! (1995)
 Now That's What I Call Music! 2 (1996)
 Now That's What I Call Music! 3 (1996)
 Now That's What I Call Music! 4 (1997)
 Now That's What I Call Music! 5 (1997)
 Now That's What I Call Music! 6 (1998)
 Now That's What I Call Music! 7 (2000)
 Now That's What I Call Music! 8 (2001)
 Now That's What I Call Music! 9 (2002)

Netherlands

Original series 
 Now This Is Music (1984)
Now This Is Music 2 (1985)
Now This Is Music 3 (1985)
Now This Is Music 4 (1986)
Now This Is Music 5 (1986)
Now This Is Music 6 (1987)
Now This Is Music 7 (1987)
Now This Is Music 8 (1988)
Now This Is Music 9 (1988)
Now This Is Music 10 (1989)
Now This Is Music 11 (1989)

Second series 
Now This Is Music 1 (1997)
Now This Is Music 2 (1997)

Special editions 
Now This Is Music: The Sound of the 80's, Vol. 1 (1992)
Now Dance Hits 95 – Jaaroverzicht
Now Dance Hits 96 – Jaaroverzicht
Now Dance Hits 97 – Jaaroverzicht
Now This Is X-Mas (1997)

New Zealand

Original series 
Now That's What I Call Music (1984) (Vinyl)

Second series 
Now That's What I Call Music Volume 1 (1992)
Now That's What I Call Music Volume 2 (1993)
Now That's What I Call Music Volume 3 (1993)

Current series 
Now That's What I Call Music (1997)
Now That's What I Call Music 2 (1998)
Now That's What I Call Music 3 (1998)
Now That's What I Call Music 4 (1999)
Now That's What I Call Music 5 (1999)
Now That's What I Call Music 6 (2000)
Now That's What I Call Music 7 (2000)
Now That's What I Call Music 8 (2001)
Now That's What I Call Music 9 (2001)
Now That's What I Call Music 10 (2002)
Now That's What I Call Music 11 (2002)
Now That's What I Call Music 12 (2003)
Now That's What I Call Music 13 (2003)
Now That's What I Call Music 14 (2004)
Now That's What I Call Music 15 (2004)
Now That's What I Call Music 16 (2004)
Now That's What I Call Music 17 (2005)
Now That's What I Call Music 18 (2005)
Now That's What I Call Music 19 (2005)
Now That's What I Call Music 20 (2006)
Now That's What I Call Music 21 (2006)
Now That's What I Call Music 22 (2006)
Now That's What I Call Music 23 (2007)
Now That's What I Call Music 24 (2007)
Now That's What I Call Music 25 (2007)
Now That's What I Call Music 26 (2008)
Now That's What I Call Music 27 (2008)
Now That's What I Call Music 28 (2008)
Now That's What I Call Music 29 (2009)
Now That's What I Call Music 30 (2009)
Now That's What I Call Music 31 (2009)
Now That's What I Call Music 32 (2010)
Now That's What I Call Music 33 (2010)
Now That's What I Call Music 34 (2010)
Now That's What I Call Music 35 (2011)
Now That's What I Call Music 36 (2011)
Now That's What I Call Music 37 (2011)
Now That's What I Call Music 38 (2012)
Now That's What I Call Music 39 (2012)
Now That's What I Call Music 40 (2012)
Now That's What I Call Music 41 (2013)
Now That's What I Call Music 42 (2013)
Now That's What I Call Music 43 (2013)
Now That's What I Call Music 44 (2014)
Now That's What I Call Music 45 (2014)
Now That's What I Call Music 46 (2014)
Now That's What I Call Music 47 (2015)
Now That's What I Call Music 48 (2015)
Now That's What I Call Music 49 (2015)
Now That's What I Call Music 50 (2016)
Now That's What I Call Music 51 (2016)
Now That's What I Call Music 52 (2016)
Now That's What I Call Music 53 (2017)
Now That's What I Call Music 54 (2017)
Now That's What I Call Music! 55 (2017)
Now That's What I Call Music! 56 (2018)
Now That's What I Call Music! 57 (2018)
Now That's What I Call Music! 58 (2018)
Now That's What I Call Music! 59 (2019)
Now That's What I Call Music! 60 (2019)
Now That's What I Call Music! 61 (2020)

Special editions 
Now That's What I Call Xmas (2010)
Now That's What I Call Christmas (2014)

Norway

Original series 
 Now That's What I Call Music! 1 (2009)
 Now That's What I Call Music! 2 (2010)
 Now That's What I Call Music! 3 (2010)
 Now That's What I Call Music! 4 (2010)
 Now That's What I Call Music! 5 (2011)
 Now That's What I Call Music! 6 (2011)
 Now That's What I Call Music! 7 (2011)
 Now That's What I Call Music! 8 (2012)
 Now That's What I Call Music! 9 Dance Edition (2012)
 Now That's What I Call Music! 10 (2012)
 Now That's What I Call Music! 11 Dance Edition (2013)

Special editions 
 Now That's What I Call Music! Hits 2009 (2009)
 Now That's What I Call Music! Dance 1 (2009)
 Now That's What I Call Music! Dance 2 (2010)
 NOW – That's What I Call Music! White Christmas (2010)
 Now That's What I Call Music! Hits 2010 (2010)
 Now That's What I Call Music! Hits 2011 (2011)
 God Jul – Now That's What I Call Music (2011)
 Now That's What I Call Music! Woman (2011)
 Now That's What I Call Music! Hits 2012 (2012)

Poland

Original series 
Now To Jest Twoja Muzyka! 01
Now To Jest Twoja Muzyka! 02
Now To Jest Twoja Muzyka! 03
Now To Jest Twoja Muzyka! 04
Now To Jest Twoja Muzyka! 05 (1998)
Now To Jest Twoja Muzyka! 06 (1999)
Now To Jest Twoja Muzyka! 07
Now To Jest Twoja Muzyka! 08 (2000)

Season series 
Now Spring & Summer 2008! (2008)

Current series 
Now That's What I Call Music! 01 (2010)
Now That's What I Call Music! 02 (2011)

Portugal

Original series 
Now 99 (6 December 1999)
Now 2 (17 July 2000)
Now 3 (4 December 2000)
Now 4 (6 June 2001)
Now 5 (28 November 2001)
Now 6 (6 June 2002)
Now 7 (28 November 2002)
Now 8 (6 June 2003)
Now 9 (24 November 2003)
Now 10 (6 June 2004)
Now 11 (26 November 2004)
Now 12 (6 June 2005)
Now 13 (21 November 2005)
Now 14 (6 June 2006)
Now 15 (20 November 2006)
Now 16 (2 July 2007)
Now 17 (2 December 2007)
Now 18 (23 June 2008)
Now 19 (24 November 2008)
Now 20 (29 June 2009)
Now 21 (16 November 2009)
Now 22 (21 June 2010)
Now 23 (22 November 2010)
Now 24 (20 June 2011)
Now 25 (14 November 2011)
Now 26 (10 June 2012)
Now 27 (19 November 2012)
Now 28 (5 December 2013)
Now 29 (2014)
Now 30 (2015)
Now 31 (2016)
Now 32 (2017)
Now 33 (2018)
Now 34 (2019)
Now 35 (2020)
Now 36 (2021)
Now 37 (2022)

Dance series 
 Now Dance (18 September 2001)
 Now Dance 2 (7 October 2002)
 Now Dance 2004 (3 May 2004)
 Now Dance 2005 (2 May 2005)
 Now Dance 2007 (19 February 2007)
 Now Dance 2008 (5 May 2008)

Mix series 
 Now Mix 2010 (26 April 2010)
 Now Mix 2 (3 October 2010)
 Now Mix 3 – Mixed by Wise Guys (18 April 2011)

Special editions 
 Now DVD (24 February 2003)
 Now 10 Anos – Os Maiores Êxitos Da Última Década (30 November 2009)

Saudi Arabia
 Now That's What I Call Arabia (2000)
 Now That's What I Call Arabia 2 (2001)
 Now That's What I Call Arabia 3 (2001)
 Now That's What I Call Arabia 4 (2002)
 Now That's What I Call Arabia 5 (2003)
 Now That's What I Call Arabia 6 (2004)
 Now That's What I Call Arabia 7 (2004)
 Now That's What I Call Arabia 8 (2005)
 Now That's What I Call Arabia 9 (2006)
 Now That's What I Call Arabia 10 (2007)
 Now That's What I Call Arabia 11 (2008)
 Now That's What I Call Arabia 12 (2010)
 Now That's What I Call Arabia 13 (2011)

South Africa 
 Now That's What I Call Music! (1984)
 Now That's What I Call Music! II (1984)
 Now That's What I Call Music! 3 (1985)
 Now That's What I Call Music! 4 (1986)
 Now That's What I Call Music! 5 (1986)
 Now That's What I Call Music! 6 (1987)
 Now That's What I Call Music! 7 (1987)
 Now That's What I Call Music! 8 (1988)
 Now That's What I Call Music! 9 (1988)
 Now That's What I Call Music! 10 (1989)
 Now That's What I Call Music! 11 (1989)
 Now That's What I Call Music! 12 (1990)
 Now That's What I Call Music! 13 (1990)
 Now That's What I Call Music! 14 (1991)
 Now That's What I Call Music! 15 (1991)
 Now That's What I Call Music! 16 (1992)
 Now That's What I Call Music! 17 (1992)
 Now That's What I Call Music! 18 (1993)
 Now That's What I Call Music! 19 (1993)
 Now That's What I Call Music! 20 (1995)
 Now That's What I Call Music! 21 (1995)
 Now That's What I Call Music! 22 (1996)
 Now That's What I Call Music! 23 The Superhit Collection (1997)
 Now That's What I Call Music! 24 (1998)
 Now That's What I Call Music! 25 (1999)
 Now That's What I Call Music! 26 (1999)
 Now That's What I Call Music! 27 (2000)
 Now That's What I Call Music! 28 (2000)
 Now That's What I Call Music! 29 (2001)
 Now That's What I Call Music! 30 (2001)
 Now That's What I Call Music! 31 (2001)
 Now That's What I Call Music! 32 (2002)
 Now That's What I Call Music! 33 (2002)
 Now That's What I Call Music! 34 (2003)
 Now That's What I Call Music! 35 (2003)
 Now That's What I Call Music! 36 (2004)
 Now That's What I Call Music! 37 (2004)
 Now That's What I Call Music! 38 (2004)
 Now That's What I Call Music! 39 (2005)
 Now That's What I Call Music! 40 (2005)
 Now That's What I Call Music! 41 (2005)
 Now That's What I Call Music! 42 (2006)
 Now That's What I Call Music! 43 (2006)
 Now That's What I Call Music! 44 (2006)
 Now That's What I Call Music! 45 (2007)
 Now That's What I Call Music! 46 (2007)
 Now That's What I Call Music! 47 (2007)
 Now That's What I Call Music! 48 (2008)
 Now That's What I Call Music! 49 (2008)
 Now That's What I Call Music! 50 (2008)
 Now That's What I Call Music! 51 (2009)
 Now That's What I Call Music! 52 (2009)
 Now That's What I Call Music! 53 (2009)
 Now That's What I Call Music! 54 (2010)
 Now That's What I Call Music! 55 (2010)
 Now That's What I Call Music! 56 (2010)
 Now That's What I Call Music! 57 (2011)
 Now That's What I Call Music! 58 (2011)
 Now That's What I Call Music! 59 (2011)
 Now That's What I Call Music! 60 (2012)
 Now That's What I Call Music! 61 (2012)
 Now That's What I Call Music! 62 (2012)
 Now That's What I Call Music! 63 (2013)
 Now That's What I Call Music! 64 (2013)
 Now That's What I Call Music! 65 (2013)
 Now That's What I Call Music! 66 (2014)
 Now That's What I Call Music! 67 (2014)
 Now That's What I Call Music! 68 (2014)
 Now That's What I Call Music! 69 (2015)
 Now That's What I Call Music! 70 (2015)
 Now That's What I Call Music! 71 (2015)
 Now That's What I Call Music! 72 (2016)
 Now That's What I Call Music! 73 (2016)
 Now That's What I Call Music! 74 (2016)
 Now That's What I Call Music! 75 (2017)
 Now That's What I Call Music! 76 (2017)
 Now That's What I Call Music! 77 (2017)
 Now That's What I Call Music! 78 (2018)
 Now That's What I Call Music! 79 (2018)
 Now That's What I Call Music! 80 (2018)
 Now That's What I Call Music! 81 (2019)
 Now That's What I Call Music! 82 (2019)
 Now That's What I Call Music! 83 (2020)

Best Of series (1995-2019) 
 Now That's What I Call Music! The Best of '95 (1995)
 Now That's What I Call Music! The Best of '96 (1996)
 Now That's What I Call Music! 1997 (1997)
 Now That's What I Call Music! The Best of 10 Years (1995)
 Now That's What I Call Music! Years: The Best of 1995–2005 (2005)
 Now That's What I Call Noughties: The Best of Now 2000–2007 (2008)
 Now That's What I Call a No 1 (the greatest no. 1 hits from 1984 to 2014) (2014)
 Now That's What I Call 21st Century (2015)
 Now That's What I Call 20th Century (2018)
 Now That's What I Call a Decade 2010 - 2019 (2019)
 Now That's What I Call a Decade 2000 - 2009 (2020)

Now and Then series 
 Now That's What I Call Music! And Then (2004)
 Now That's What I Call Music! And Then Volume 2 (2004)

Special editions 
 Now That's What I Call Classical (2011)
 Now That's What I Call Country (2012)
 Now That's What I Call Dance (2012)
 Now That's What I Call Xmas (2012)
 Now That's What I Call Dance 2 (2013)
 Now That's What I Call R&B (2013)
 Now That's What I Call Dance 3 (2013)
 Now That's What I Call a Power Ballad (2013)
 Now That's What I Call Movies (2014)
 Now That's What I Call Country 2 (2014)
 Now That's What I Call Dance 4 (2014)
 Now That's What I Call The 80's (2014)
 Now That's What I Call Dance 5 (2014)
 Now That's What I Call Dance 6 (2015)
 Now That's What I Call The 90's (2015)
 Now That's What I Call Dance 7 (2015)
 Now That's What I Call Legends (2015)
 Now That's What I Call a Song (2016)
 Now That's What I Call Dance 8 (2016)
 Now That's What I Call a Summer Party (2016)
 Now That's What I Call Dance 9 (2016)
 Now That's What I Call a Rock Ballad (2017)
 Now That's What I Call Dance 10 (2017)
 Now That's What I Call a RoadTrip (2017)
 Now That's What I Call Dance 11 (2017)
 Now That's What I Call a Singer (2018)
 Now That's What I Call a Summer Holiday (2018)
 Now That's What I Call Dance 12 (2018)
 Now That's What I Call 80s Pop (2019)
 Now That's What I Call Dance 13 (2019)
 Now That's What I Call a Decade: 2010-2019 (2019)
Now That's What I Call a Decade: 2000-2009 (2020)

DVD series 
 Now That's What I Call Music! The DVD (2005)
 Now That's What I Call Music! The DVD Vol.2 (2005)
 Now That's What I Call Music! The DVD Vol.3 (2006)
 Now That's What I Call Music! The DVD Vol.4 (2006)
 Now That's What I Call Music! The DVD Vol.5 (2006)
 Now That's What I Call Music! The DVD Vol.6 (2007)
 Now That's What I Call Music! The DVD Vol.7 (2007)
 Now That's What I Call Music! The DVD Vol.8 (2007)
 Now That's What I Call Music! The DVD Vol.9 (2008)
 Now That's What I Call Music! The DVD Vol.10 (2008)
 Now That's What I Call Music! The DVD Vol.11 (2008)
 Now That's What I Call Music! The DVD Vol.12 (2009)
 Now That's What I Call Music! The DVD Vol.13 (2009)
 Now That's What I Call Music! The DVD Vol.14 (2009)
 Now That's What I Call Music! The DVD Vol.15 (2010)
 Now That's What I Call Music! The DVD Vol.16 (2010)
 Now That's What I Call Music! The DVD Vol.17 (2010)
 Now That's What I Call Music! The DVD Vol.18 (2011)
 Now That's What I Call Music! The DVD Vol.19 (2011)
 Now That's What I Call Music! The DVD Vol.20 (2011)
 Now That's What I Call Music! The DVD Vol.21 (2012)
 Now That's What I Call Music! The DVD Vol.22 (2012)
 Now That's What I Call Music! The DVD Vol.23 (2012)
 Now That's What I Call Music! The DVD Vol.24 (2013)
 Now That's What I Call Music! The DVD Vol.25 (2013)
 Now That's What I Call Music! The DVD Vol.26 (2013)
 Now That's What I Call Music! The DVD Vol.27 (2014)
 Now That's What I Call Music! The DVD Vol.28 (2014)
 Now That's What I Call Music! The DVD Vol.29 (2014)
 Now That's What I Call Music! The DVD Vol.30 (2015)
 Now That's What I Call Music! The DVD 2015 (2015)
 Now That's What I Call Music! The DVD 2016 (2016)

Spain

Original series 
 Now Esto si es música I
 Now Esto si es música 2
 Now Esto si es música 3
 Now Esto si es música 4
 Now Esto si es música 5
 Now Esto si es música 6
 Now Esto si es musica 7
 Now Esto si es musica 8
 Now Esto si es musica 9
 Now Esto si es musica 10

Second series 
 Now Esto es música 1
 Now Esto es música 2003
 Now Esto es musica 2004
 Now Esto es musica 2005
 Now Esto es musica 2006
 Now Los Éxitos Del Año 2014

Turkey

Original series 
 Now That's What I Call Music! 1
 Now That's What I Call Music! 2
 Now That's What I Call Music! 3
 Now That's What I Call Music! 4
 Now That's What I Call Music! 5
 Now That's What I Call Music! 6

Second series 
 Now That's What I Call Music! 2000

The DVD series 
 Now That's What I Call Arabia The DVD
 Now That's What I Call Arabia The DVD 2
 Now That's What I Call Arabia The DVD 3
 Now That's What I Call Arabia The DVD 4
 Now That's What I Call Arabia The DVD 5

Dance series 
 Now Dance Arabia
 Now Dance Arabia 2004
 Now Dance Arabia 2005
 Now Dance Arabia 2006
 Now Dance Arabia 2007
 Now Dance Arabia 2008
 Now Dance Arabia 2009
 Now Dance Arabia 2010
 Now Dance Arabia 2011
 Now Dance Arabia 2012

Love series 
 Now Love Arabia
 Now Love Arabia 2
 Now That's What I Call Love Arabia 2006
 Now That's What I Call Love Arabia 2007
 Now That's What I Call Love Arabia 2008
 Now That's What I Call Love Arabia 2009
 Now That's What I Call Love Arabia 2010
 Now That's What I Call Love Arabia 2011
 The Best Of Now That's What I Call Love Arabia

Love DVD series
 Now That's What I Call Love Arabia The DVD (2008)

Special editions 
 Now That's What I Call Arabia 2000
 Now That's What I Call Arabia 2001
 Now That's What I Call Arabia 2002
 Now That's What I Call Arabia 2003
 Now That's What I Call Arabia 2004
 Now That's What I Call Arabia 2005
 Now That's What I Call Arabia 2005 Vol. 2
 Now That's What I Call Arabia 2006
 Now That's What I Call Arabia 2007
 Now That's What I Call Arabia 2008
 Now That's What I Call Arabia 2009
 Now That's What I Call Arabia 2010
 Now That's What I Call Arabia 2011
 Now That's What I Call Arabia Decades 1990–2000
 Now That's What I Call Arabia Decades 2000–2010
 Now That's What I Call Arabia Decades 2000–2010 Volume Two

Notes
A  After 61 volumes the physical format was dropped and was released as streaming only
B  After 83 volumes the physical format was dropped and was released as streaming only

References 

 Discography
Pop music discographies